This is a list of High Court judges of Northern Ireland, arranged by order of appointment, as of 16 December 2022:

The Hon Mr Justice O'Hara, 
The Hon Mr Justice Colton, 
The Hon Madam Justice McBride, 
The Hon Mr Justice McAlinden, 
The Hon Mr Justice Huddleston, 
The Hon Mr Justice Scoffield, 
The Hon Mr Justice McFarland, 
The Hon Mr Justice Humphreys, 
The Hon Mr Justice Rooney, 
The Hon Mr Justice Fowler, 
The Hon Mr Justice Kinney,

References

See also
 Lord Chief Justice of Northern Ireland
 List of Lords Justices of Appeal of Northern Ireland

Northern Ireland law-related lists
 
Lists of people from Northern Ireland by occupation
Lists of judges in the United Kingdom